Hatidža is a Bosnian feminine given name. Notable people with the name include:

Hatidža Hadžiosmanović (1938–2015), Bosnian judge
Hatidža Mehmedović (1952–2018), Bosnian human rights activist

Bosnian feminine given names